Joseph Gibson Moss (April 26, 1922 – March 22, 2009) was an American lawyer and politician who served as a state legislator and chancery judge in Mississippi. He served in the Mississippi House of Representatives for Hinds County.

Early life 
Joseph Gibson Moss was born on April 26, 1922 in Jackson, Mississippi. He attended public schools in the city before transferring out of Central High School his senior year to attend Agricultural High School in Raymond. He enrolled at Hinds Junior College and played on the football team. While there he met Permelia Williams, and the two married on June 6, 1944. Moss enlisted in the U.S. Army and served in France, Belgium, Germany, and Austria during World War II, rising to the rank of sergeant in the 281st Combat Engineers Battalion. At the end of the war he returned to Hinds and received his associate's degree before attending Mississippi State University, where he earned a bachelor's degree in agricultural economics.

Following graduation, Moss taught agriculture classes at a high school in Clinton. He earned a law degree from Jackson School of Law and practiced law in Raymond from 1954 to 1979.

Political career 
In 1956 Moss was elected to the Mississippi House of Representatives at-large seat for Hinds County. He served out five terms, leaving the body in 1975, after losing reelection in a Democratic primary matchup with another incumbent due to district reapportionment in Hinds County. He served on the Mississippi Sovereignty Commission from 1960 to 1968.

In 1978 Moss was elected chancery judge for the Fifth Chancery Court District. He served three terms in that post and thereafter was assigned special cases as a senior status judge until 1992.

He was a Democrat.

Later life 
In 1999, the Hinds Community College baseball field was named in Moss' honor. He died on March 22, 2009.

References

Works cited 
 

1922 births
2009 deaths
Democratic Party members of the Mississippi House of Representatives